Danny or Daniel Rich may refer to:

 Danny Rich, a character in the film Anaconda
 Danny Rich (rabbi), former Chief Executive of Liberal Judaism in the United Kingdom
Daniel Rich, Australian sportsman